William Henry Ryan (May 10, 1860 – November 18, 1939) was an American businessman and politician who served one term as a U.S. Representative from New York from 1899 to 1909.

Biography 
Born in Hopkinton, Massachusetts, Ryan moved to Buffalo, New York, with his parents in 1866, where he attended the local schools. He engaged in the retail shoe business and later in the general insurance and bonding business.

Political career 
In 1894, Ryan was elected to the board of supervisors of Erie County at the age of 34. He was reelected in 1897, and served as chairman in 1898.

Congress 
That same year, Ryan was elected as a Democrat to the 56th United States Congress, where he served from March 4, 1899 to March 3, 1909. He ran unsuccessfully for renomination to his incumbent seat in 1908.

He served as delegate to the Democratic National Conventions in 1904, and 1924.

Later career and death 
He resumed the insurance and bonding business in Buffalo, New York, and engaged for a time in banking. He served as a member of the grade crossing and terminal commission (1919–1939); and as member of the Allegany State Park Commission (1930–1939).

He died in Buffalo, New York on November 18, 1939. He was interred in Mount Calvary Cemetery, at Pine Hill, near Buffalo, New York.

Sources

External links 
 

1860 births
1939 deaths
Democratic Party members of the United States House of Representatives from New York (state)
People from Hopkinton, Massachusetts